Morgane (born Ingrid Simonis; 23 August 1975, in Blegny) is a Belgian singer, best known for her participation in the 1992 Eurovision Song Contest.

Eurovision Song Contest 

On 8 March 1992, Morgane's song "Nous, on veut des violons" ("We Want Violins") was chosen from ten entrants as Belgium's representative in the 37th Eurovision Song Contest, which took place on 9 May in Malmö, Sweden.  "Nous, on veut des violons" proved unsuccessful at the contest, finishing in 20th place of 23 entries, having received points from only four other countries.

Later career 

After Eurovision, Morgane released several more records and made frequent television appearances, before falling out of view in the mid-1990s. She continued her involvement in music, albeit not in the public eye, and became a mother of three children.

Morgane has recently (2009) relaunched her career, now performing rock/gothic-influenced music.

References

External links 
  (French) 

1975 births
Living people
People from Blegny
Eurovision Song Contest entrants for Belgium
Eurovision Song Contest entrants of 1992
21st-century Belgian women singers
21st-century Belgian singers